Sidney Check, also known as Sid Check, (August 2, 1930 – June 19, 2002) was an American comic book artist best known for his stories in EC Comics.


Sidney Charles Check was born on August 2, 1930, in Newark, New Jersey.  His parents Abraham Check and Ida Applebaum-Check were Polish immigrants who had come to the United States in 1926. By 1940 he was living in Coney Island, Brooklyn where he befriended Frank Frazetta with whom he would collaborate in comic books a decade later.  In 1948 Check graduated from the School of Industrial Art in Manhattan, and the following year he broke into comic books, working with Wally Wood, as well as on solo assignments.
 
Sid Check was often compared to Wally Wood because of a stylistic resemblance. His work appeared in EC's New Trend titles: Crime SuspenStories, The Haunt of Fear, The Vault of Horror and Weird Science. He drew for several Marvel Comics series, including Weird Wonder Tales, Battle Action, Journey into Unknown Worlds. For Magazine Enterprises he contributed to White Indian. He also drew for Classics Illustrated and for Harvey Comics' Tomb of Terror.

Apocolytes's World of Comics commented:

When Check left comic books in 1958 he took up work with the United States Postal Service, though he drew a few stories in the early 1970s for DC Comics' war titles, and spot illustrations for Amazing Stories during the mid-1970s.

He died on June 19, 2002, in Coney Island.

References

Sources
GCD

Further reading
Feiffer, Jules. Backing into Forward: A Memoir, Doubleday, 2010.

External links
Who's Who of American Comic Books
Comics: Searching for Sid Check

1930 births
2002 deaths
American cartoonists
American comics artists
American speculative fiction artists
EC Comics